Jakraprop Saengsee (former name Kitisak Saengsee, born 16 January 1995) is a member of the Thailand men's national volleyball team.

Clubs 
  Chonburi (2014–2016)
  Air Force (2016–present)

Awards

Clubs 
 2015–16 Thailand League -  Bronze Medal, with Chonburi E-Tech Air Force
 2016–17 Thailand League -  Champion, with Air Force
 2017 Thai–Denmark Super League -  Runner-up, with Air Force
 2017–18 Thailand League -  Champion, with Air Force
 2017–18 Thailand League -  Champion, with Air Force
 2019 Thai–Denmark Super League -  Runner-Up, with Air Force

References

1995 births
Living people
Jakraprop Saengsee
Jakraprop Saengsee
Jakraprop Saengsee
Southeast Asian Games medalists in volleyball
South China AA volleyball players
Competitors at the 2017 Southeast Asian Games
Volleyball players at the 2018 Asian Games
Competitors at the 2019 Southeast Asian Games
Jakraprop Saengsee
Opposite hitters
Jakraprop Saengsee
Jakraprop Saengsee
Jakraprop Saengsee